"I Hate a Mystery" was the tenth episode of the first season of the TV series M*A*S*H. Originally airing on November 26, 1972 and repeated on June 10, 1973, it was written by Hal Dressner and was directed by Hy Averback.

Guest cast is Patrick Adiarte as Ho-Jon, Timothy Brown as Spearchucker Jones, Odessa Cleveland as Ginger, Linda Meiklejohn as Lt. Scorch, and Bonnie Jones as Lt. Barbara Bannerman.

Overview

A rash of thefts breaks out in the camp. Missing pieces include Frank's silver picture frame, Margaret's hair brush, and Trapper's watch. The camp is searched and everything is found in Hawkeye's locker, leaving the other MASH personnel suspicious of, and disappointed in, Hawkeye.

Hawkeye manages to let it be known to the camp the location where the recovered items are being stored (Lt. Col. Blake's desk). When the items disappear yet again, Hawkeye summons many of the MASH personnel to the mess tent in the middle of the night in order to reveal the identity of the criminal. After parodying countless detective stories by revealing possible motives others might have to frame him (jealousy, resentment, etc.), he tells the assembled staff that he has treated the items with a chemical which, when it comes into contact with a human being, turns that person's fingernails blue.

When Ho-Jon hides his hands, Hawkeye knows he has found the criminal. (The chemical treatment story was merely a bluff.) Ho-Jon is not punished, however, as he has stolen the items only to raise money to bribe border guards to bring his family from the north to the south. 

The plot was presumably inspired by a similar ruse used by the mathematician John Napier to identify a thief among his household staff.

The title, "I Hate a Mystery," is a reference to one of the most popular radio serials of the golden age, "I Love a Mystery," created by Carlton E. Morse.

References

External links

M*A*S*H (season 1) episodes
1972 American television episodes